

Pioneers 
These are copywriters who had a major influence on the modern advertising industry, particularly during its formative years.

 Earnest Elmo Calkins (1868–1964), a pioneer of the soft sell
 Robert Collier (1885-1950), a pioneer of direct mail and self-help 
 Stan Freberg (1926–2015), a pioneer of satire in advertisements
 Claude C. Hopkins (1866–1932), a pioneer of direct marketing
 Albert Lasker (1880 - 1952), a pioneer of radio advertising and political campaigns
 John Emory Powers (1837–1919), the world's first full-time copywriter
 Rosser Reeves (1910-1984), developed the idea of the unique selling proposition
 John Salmon (1931-2017), a British advertising executive.

Founders 
These are copywriters who went on to found major multinational advertising agencies.

 David Abbott, founder of Abbott Mead Vickers BBDO
 William Bernbach, founder of DDB Worldwide
 Marcel Bleustein-Blanchet founder of Publicis
 Leo Burnett, founder of Leo Burnett Worldwide
 Jay Chiat, founder of  Chiat/Day
 Fairfax M. Cone, founder of Foote Cone & Belding
 Harry McCann, co-founder of McCann Erickson
 David Ogilvy, founder of Ogilvy & Mather
 Alex Osborn, co-founder of BBDO, and inventor of brainstorming
 Raymond Rubicam, co-founder of Young & Rubicam
 Charles Saatchi, co-founder of Saatchi & Saatchi
 Dan Wieden, co-founder of Wieden+Kennedy

Award winners 
.

These are copywriters or former copywriters who have been inducted into a hall of fame or received a lifetime achievement award, sometimes posthumously.

 Ted Bates, 1982 Advertising Hall of Fame inductee
 Charles H. Brower, 1982 Advertising Hall of Fame inductee
 Phil Dusenberry, 2003 Advertising Hall of Fame inductee, 2007 One Club Creative Hall of Fame inductee
 Bernice Fitz-Gibbon, 1982 Advertising Hall of Fame inductee, 1967 One Club Creative Hall of Fame inductee
 Jo Foxworth, 1997 Advertising Hall of Fame inductee
 Benjamin Franklin, 1950 Advertising Hall of Fame inductee
 Mary Frances Gerety, created A Diamond is Forever, the 'slogan of the century' according to Advertising Age
 Howard Gossage, 1970 One Club Creative Hall of Fame inductee
 O. Milton Gossett, 1999 Advertising Hall of Fame inductee
 Paula Green, 2012 One Club Creative Hall of Fame inductee
 Steve Hayden, 2013 One Club Creative Hall of Fame inductee
 Julian Koenig, 1966 One Club Creative Hall of Fame inductee, 1966 One Club Creative Hall of Fame inductee   
 Alex Kroll, 1998 Advertising Hall of Fame inductee
 Mary Wells Lawrence, 2000 Advertising Hall of Fame inductee, 1969 One Club Creative Hall of Fame inductee 
 Ed McCabe, 1974 One Club Creative Hall of Fame inductee   
 Shirley Polykoff, 1981 Advertising Hall of Fame inductee, 1974 One Club Creative Hall of Fame inductee   
 Erma Perham Proetz, 1952 Advertising Hall of Fame inductee
 Rosser Reeves, 1994 Advertising Hall of Fame inductee, 1965 One Club Creative Hall of Fame inductee   
 Helen Lansdowne Resor, 1967 Advertising Hall of Fame inductee
 Jean Wade Rindlaub, 1990 Advertising Hall of Fame inductee
 Jim Riswold, 2013 One Club Creative Hall of Fame inductee
 Phyllis Robinson, 1968 One Club Creative Hall of Fame inductee
 Dave Trott, 2004 Design and Art Direction lifetime achievement award
 Artemas Ward, 1975 Advertising Hall of Fame inductee 
 Lester Wunderman, 1999 Advertising Hall of Fame inductee

Former copywriters 

Many creative artists spent time early in their careers working as copywriters. This is a list of such people – specifically, people who worked as copywriters before achieving notability in a creative field outside advertising. The names are followed by the careers in which they are notable.

 Phillip Adams, broadcaster and columnist
 Eric Ambler, author
 Sherwood Anderson, author
 J. G. Ballard, author
 Helen Gurley Brown, publisher and editor
  David "Lil Dicky" Burd, rapper, comedian
 Augusten Burroughs, author
 William S. Burroughs, author
 Peter Carey, author
 Iordan Chimet, poet, essayist and children's author
 Bryce Courtenay, author
 Don DeLillo, author
 Nikos Dimou, columnist, writer and talk show host
 Kenny Everett, comedian and radio DJ
 Jennie Fields, novelist
 F. Scott Fitzgerald, author
 Kitty Flanagan, comedian
 Terry Gilliam, film director and animator
 Alec Guinness, actor
 Dashiell Hammett, author
 Sarah Hampson, columnist and author
 Hugh Hefner, publisher
 Joseph Heller, author
 Russell Hoban, author
 Laura Z. Hobson, novelist.
 John Hughes, film director, writer
 Shigesato Itoi, writer, video-game designer
 Thom Jones, author
 Lawrence Kasdan, film director, screenwriter
 Tim Kazurinsky, comedian
 Dan Kennedy, author
 Philip Kerr, author
 Elmore Leonard, author
 Amulya Malladi, author
 Vladimir Mayakovsky, poet, playwright
 Peter Mayle, author
 Chan Mou, comic artist
 Rick Moranis, actor
 Ogden Nash, poet
 Bob Newhart, comedian and actor
 Alan Parker, film director
 James Patterson, author
 Frederik Pohl, science-fiction author
 Steven Pressfield, author
 Franc Roddam, film director
 Salman Rushdie, author
 John Safran, documentary maker and author
 Dorothy L. Sayers, author
 Indra Sinha, author
 Elizabeth Smart, poet, author
 Chrissie Swan, TV and radio presenter
 Jaideep Varma, film director and screenwriter
 Kurt Vonnegut, author
 Murray Walker, commentator, journalist
 Fay Weldon, author
 Antonia White, author
 Frank Zappa, musician

Other 
These are notable people who have worked as copywriters but do not fit into the categories above. Some achieved notability in another field before becoming copywriters, while others have combined copywriting with another career. 
 Gabriella Ambrosio, a novelist and academic who continued to work in advertising.
 Pinkie Barnes, a table tennis champion who later became a copywriter.
 Gary Comer, founder of a mail-order clothing company.
 Robert Duncan, a music critic.
 Carol Gran, a Canadian politician.
 Adam Hanft, a comedy writer who later became a copywriter.
 Arne Hjeltnes, a Norwegian politician, television host and writer.
 Prasoon Joshi, a lyricist, poet and screenwriter.
 Herschell Gordon Lewis, a film director who later became a copywriter.
  John Singleton, a businessman.

See also 
 Category:Copywriters

References

Copywriters
 List